Eileen Mabel Uebergang (28 December 1935 – 22 January 2019) was an Australian cricket player. Massey played four Test matches for the Australia national women's cricket team.

References

1935 births
2019 deaths
Australia women Test cricketers
Cricketers from Western Australia
People from Albany, Western Australia